The 2023 Edmonton Elks season is scheduled to be the 65th season for the team in the Canadian Football League and their 74th overall. The Elks will attempt to improve upon their  record from 2021, qualify for the playoffs, and win their 15th Grey Cup championship.

The team's 2023 season will be the second under head coach and general manager, Chris Jones.

Offseason

CFL Global Draft
The 2023 CFL Global Draft is scheduled to take place on May 2, 2023. If the same format as the 2022 CFL Global Draft is used, the Elks will have three selections in the draft with the second-best odds to win the weighted draft lottery.

CFL National Draft
The 2023 CFL Draft is scheduled to take place on May 2, 2023. The Elks are scheduled to have nine selections in the eight-round draft, including a territorial selection. The team acquired additional selections in the second and third rounds, but also forfeited a second round pick after drafting J-Min Pelley in the 2022 Supplemental Draft.

Preseason

Regular season

Season standings

Season schedule

Team

Roster

Coaching staff

References

External links
 

Edmonton Elks seasons
2023 Canadian Football League season by team
2023 in Alberta